Jean Watson  (1933 – 2014) was a New Zealand novelist and humanitarian. She is notable for her first novel Stand in the Rain and for her work with an orphanage in southern India, which is the subject of the documentary Aunty and the Star People. Stand in the Rain is, in part, about her marriage to New Zealand author Barry Crump.

Early life 
Watson was born in 1933 and lived on a farm near Whangarei during her childhood. She later became a freelance writer in Wellington, where she also got a degree in religious studies from Victoria University. From 1962 Watson lived with Barry Crump and they were married for ten years.

India 
In the 1980s Watson took a trip to India where she met a man named Subbiah who was trying to collect funds to open an orphanage. Watson returned home, sold her house, then used most of the funds to support the creation of an orphanage in Kanyakumari, Tamil Nadu. She also supported the building of a school and community college in the same area. This story, along with the conflicts she had with Subbiah over the ownership of the orphanage, were covered by the documentary Aunty and the Star People in 2014.

Writing 
Stand in the Rain and her 1994 novel Three Sea Stories both received critical acclaim. However her other novels The Balloon Watchers, The World is an Orange and the Sun, Flowers for Happyever: A Prose Lyric and Address to a King were paid little attention. As her writing progressed she included more elements of Vedanta philosophy. She also wrote Karunai Illam: The Story of an Orphanage in 1992 a non fiction account of her time with the orphanage.

Later life 
In 2001 she was made an Officer of the New Zealand Order of Merit. Watson died of a brain aneurism in December 2014. Her son Harry Watson plans to posthumously publish three of her novels.

Notes

References

External links
 Karunai Illam orphanage and school homepage

1933 births
2014 deaths
New Zealand women novelists
New Zealand women short story writers
20th-century New Zealand novelists
20th-century New Zealand short story writers
20th-century New Zealand women writers
Officers of the New Zealand Order of Merit